Andrea Ingegneri (born 18 January 1992) is an Italian professional footballer who plays as a centre-back for  club Viterbese.

Club career

Bologna
Ingegneri started his career at Bologna F.C. 1909.

Cesena
In June 2013 Ingegneri joined Cesena for €1.25 million in a co-ownership deal as part of the deal of Damjan Đoković for €1.4 million. Ingegneri signed a 4-year contract. Ingegneri picked no.18 shirt previously owned by Gianluca Turchetta. In June 2014 the co-ownership deals were renewed.

On 25 August Ingegneri was signed by Bassano in a temporary deal. On 25 June 2015 the co-ownership deals expired.

In July 2015 Ingegneri was signed by Pordenone in a temporary deal.

Palermo
On 6 July 2017 Ingegneri signed a 4-year contract with Palermo, under request of his former Pordenone boss Bruno Tedino, who was appointed in charge of the Rosanero for the new season. He was however sidelined by a broken anterior cruciate ligament during pre-season which forced him to skip the entire 2017–18 season, during which he made no appearances.

Modena
Following Palermo's dissolution, he joined newly promoted Serie C club Modena for the 2019–20 season. He made his debut on 25 September 2019, coming on as a substitute in the 58th minute for Salvatore Pezzella in a 1–1 draw against Sambenedettese He finished his first season as a gialloblù with 19 appearances in which he did not manage to score.

On 4 October 2020, Ingegneri scored his first goal for Modena in a 3–1 win over Vis Pesaro after a cross from Sodinha. In his second season at the club, he recorded 25 appearances in which he scored 2 goals.

Mantova
On 20 August 2022, Ingegneri signed with Mantova.

Viterbese
On 30 January 2023, Ingegneri moved to Viterbese.

References

External links
 
 AIC profile (data by www.football.it)  

1992 births
Living people
People from Lugo, Emilia-Romagna
Sportspeople from the Province of Ravenna
Footballers from Emilia-Romagna
Italian footballers
Association football defenders
Serie B players
Serie C players
Bologna F.C. 1909 players
Forlì F.C. players
A.C. Cesena players
Bassano Virtus 55 S.T. players
Pordenone Calcio players
Palermo F.C. players
Modena F.C. players
Mantova 1911 players
U.S. Viterbese 1908 players